Meryem Sarah Uzerli (born on 12 August 1983) is a Turkish-German actress who rose to prominence by playing Hürrem Sultan in the Turkish TV series Muhteşem Yüzyıl (2011–2013), for which she received critical acclaim and won numerous accolades, including a Golden Butterfly Award. Her prominent movie roles include Ayşe in Kovan, a story about bee keeping.

Early life 
Uzerli was born on 12 August 1983 and raised in Kassel, West Germany to Hüseyin, from Turkey and Ursula, an actress from Germany. She has two older brothers and an older sister, Canan, who is a jazz musician. Her great-grandmother is from Croatia. Due to her father's nationality, she has both Turkish-German citizenship. She made her acting debut with minor parts in German productions. She later made minor appearances in the television series Notruf Hafenkante (2010) and Ein Fall für zwei (2010). Uzerli is also known for her roles in German films like Journey of No Return (2010) and Jetzt aber Ballett (2010). At the end of 2010, she was chosen by Meral Okay for her first leading role in the Turkish TV series Muhteşem Yüzyıl (2011–2013). In addition to her acting career, Uzerli has appeared in many advertising films and is the face of numerous brands. In 2012, she was chosen as the Woman of the Year by GQ Turkey. Due to her role as Hurrem Sultan, she has won 23 awards and became one of the most famous actresses in Turkey.

Uzerli's native language is German. She is also fluent in Turkish and English.

Career

2011–13: Muhteşem Yüzyıl 
Uzerli's most known breakout role is as Hürrem Sultan in the historical television drama series Muhteşem Yüzyıl, directed by the Taylan Brothers. In 2010, after an eight-month search to find the best actress for this role, she was chosen by Meral Okay, the series' screenwriter, and Timur Savcı, the series' producer. About her selection, she said: "Until one day the phone rang, I was invited for a casting in Turkey, and then immediately I started living in Istanbul almost full time." She lived in a hotel for two years during the shooting of Muhteşem Yüzyıl. She shared the leading role with Halit Ergenç, Okan Yalabık and Nebahat Çehre. She won the Golden Butterfly Award for Best Actress for this part in 2012. In 2013, she left the series due to health concerns, reportedly a burnout. From episode 103 and onwards, Vahide Perçin was cast in to play an older version of Hürrem.

2014–present: Gecenin Kraliçesi and Annemin Yarası 
At the end of 2014, Uzerli signed a contract with O3, the Turkish production company of MBC Group. As of December 2014, she was still living in Berlin, but planning to move to Istanbul. In December 2014, Star TV released a video and a photo of Uzerli introducing her as one of its stars in 2015. In October 2015, she was again introduced among the TV's stars for 2016. About her future, she says: "I am trying to build on my international success within any industry where actors are respected as artists, and where I can find great scripts that allow me to delve into a story that leaves the here and now behind." In March 2015, it was finalized that Uzerli would share the leading role with Murat Yıldırım in her new TV series. The series' name was later announced as Gecenin Kraliçesi. It is directed by Muhteşem Yüzyıl directors, the Taylan Brothers. Some of the scenes for this series were filmed in Cannes, France. The shooting later continued in Rize, Turkey. It premiered on Star TV in January 2016.

In addition to her career in television, Uzerli also appeared in a cinema movie in 2016, titled Annemin Yarası. The film was released in March 2016. Her co-stars include Ozan Güven, Okan Yalabık, and Belçim Bilgin. Between 2016 and 2017, she appeared in a guest role on Eşkiya Dünyaya Hükümdar Olmaz. In 2017, she continued her movie career by appearing in Cingöz Recai opposite Kenan İmirzalıoğlu, although the film was not a box office success. Later in the same year, she shared the leading role with Özcan Deniz and Aslı Enver in the movie Öteki Taraf. In 2019, Uzerli auditioned for a role in the third season of the Netflix original series Dark. She also appeared as the lead role in the movie Kovan, the proceeds of which were donated to Haluk Levent's Ahbap foundation.

Personal life 
After leaving Turkey, Uzerli announced that she had broken up with her boyfriend, Can Ateş, after learning that he had cheated on her. She said that she was pregnant and wanted to give birth to her child. On 10 February 2014, she gave birth to a girl. A second daughter was born on 8 January 2021.

Uzerli is also a model and has appeared on the cover of Elle, Marie Claire, and InStyle magazines in Turkey, in addition to playing in advertisements for brands such as Elidor.

Filmography

Awards and nominations

References

External links 
 
 
 Meryem Uzerli: The Magnificent Hürrem Sultan

1983 births
Living people
Actors from Kassel
Turkish film actresses
Turkish television actresses
21st-century Turkish actresses
German film actresses
German television actresses
21st-century German actresses
Golden Butterfly Award winners
Turkish people of Croatian descent
Turkish people of German descent
German people of Turkish descent
German people of Croatian descent